Dronovka is a rural locality (a village) in Grayvoronsky District, Belgorod Oblast, Russia. The population was 167 as of 2010. There are 5 streets.

Geography 
Dronovka is located 29 km northwest of Grayvoron (the district's administrative centre) by road. Smorodino is the nearest rural locality.

References 

Rural localities in Grayvoronsky District